Jared Evan Moskowitz (born December 18, 1980) is an American politician serving as the U.S. representative for Florida's 23rd congressional district since 2023. A member of the Democratic Party, Moskowitz served on the Broward County Commission from 2021 to 2022 and as director of the Florida Division of Emergency Management from 2019 to 2021. Before his appointment, he served in the Florida House of Representatives, representing the Coral Springs area in northern Broward County from 2012 to 2019.

Early life and education
Moskowitz was born in Coral Springs in 1980. He earned a Bachelor of Arts degree in political science from George Washington University and a Juris Doctor from the Shepard Broad Law Center at Nova Southeastern University.

Early political career 
Moskowitz worked as an intern for Vice President Al Gore, served as an assistant on Joe Lieberman's 2004 presidential campaign, and was one of Barack Obama's Florida electors at the 2008 Democratic National Convention. While attending law school, he was elected to the Parkland City Commission in 2006 and reelected in 2010, serving until he resigned to run for the legislature in 2012. While serving as a city commissioner, Moskowitz supported efforts to make the city more eco-friendly by providing subsidies to households that purchase low-flow toilets and showerheads, energy-efficient air conditioners, and hybrid cars. After graduating, he worked for AshBritt Environmental as director of government relations and general counsel.

Florida House of Representatives 
When the state legislative districts were redrawn in 2012, Moskowitz opted to run in the newly drawn 97th district, which consisted of northern Broward County. He won the Democratic primary unopposed, and advanced to the general election, where he faced Republican nominee James Gleason, a business owner who was an unsuccessful candidate for mayor of Coral Springs. The Sun-Sentinel praised both candidates as "good choices for an open seat" but endorsed Moskowitz, declaring that his "good grasp of statewide and local issues" made him the better candidate. He defeated Gleason with 69% of the vote.

During his first term in the legislature, Moskowitz sponsored a memorial for Robert Levinson, who has been held as a hostage in Iran since 2007, calling on "Congress, the Obama administration and the Secretary of State's office to work to get Levinson home." Moskowitz's proposed memorial passed both houses of the legislature and was signed by Governor Rick Scott.

In 2014 and 2016, Moskowitz was reelected to the legislature without opposition.

In 2018, after the shooting at Marjory Stoneman Douglas High School, Moskowitz helped draft the bipartisan Marjory Stoneman Douglas High School Safety Act, the first comprehensive mental health, school safety, and gun control bill of its kind in over 20 years. This bill increased the age to purchase a firearm to 21, created a three-day waiting period to purchase firearms, increased security requirements for public schools, funded centralized school safety surveillance programs, and improved mental health services for students.

Division of Emergency Management 
On December 6, 2018, Governor-Elect Ron DeSantis announced he would appoint Moskowitz as director of the Florida Division of Emergency Management. Moskowitz resigned from the House of Representatives and took office as DEM director on January 15, 2019.

Moskowitz took over Florida's Division of Emergency Management during the recovery of Hurricane Michael, a category 5 storm that made landfall in Florida in October 2018. Recovery efforts were notably slow during early recovery, and Moskowitz is credited with speeding up the recovery process and securing historic 90% reimbursement from the federal government for all disaster assistance efforts.

In early April 2020, Moskowitz made headlines when he complained that foreign countries were paying the American company 3M to reroute millions of N95 masks destined for Florida during the COVID-19 pandemic. He said, "For the last several weeks, we have had a boiler room chasing down 3M authorized distributors [and] brokers representing that they sell the N95 masks, only get to warehouses that are completely empty." He then said the 3M-authorized U.S. distributors later told him the masks Florida contracted for never showed up because the company instead prioritized orders that came in later, for higher prices, from foreign countries, including Germany, Russia, and France. As a result, Moskowitz highlighted the issue on Twitter, saying he decided to "troll" 3M.

Moskowitz led the department during the early distribution of the COVID-19 vaccine, creating an administrative network for all 67 Florida counties. He is credited with working with community organizations, including Black and Hispanic churches, HUD housing, and senior assisted living facilities, to efficiently vaccinate at-risk populations.

Moskowitz was called the "Master of Disaster" by several news publications for his handling of the pandemic.

On February 15, 2021, Moskowitz announced his resignation from the Division of Emergency Management, citing his desire to spend time with his father, who was battling pancreatic cancer. He officially left the Division in May 2021.

On August 5, 2021, Miami-Dade Mayor Daniella Levine-Cava appointed Moskowitz to advise Miami-Dade's COVID-19 response.

U.S. House of Representatives

Elections

2022 

After incumbent congressman Ted Deutch announced that he would not seek reelection in 2022, Moskowitz declared his candidacy for Florida's 23rd congressional district. Moskowitz won the election against Republican nominee Joe Budd.

Tenure 
Moskowitz assumed office on January 3, 2023, succeeding Democrat Ted Deutch.

Political positions

COVID-19 policy 
On February 1, 2023, Moskowitz was one of 12 Democrats to vote for a resolution to end the COVID-19 national emergency.

Caucus memberships 

Congressional Equality Caucus
 New Democrat Coalition

Committees 

 Vice Chair, House Gun Violence Prevention Task Force

References

External links

 Congressman Jared Moskowitz official U.S. House website
Jared Moskowitz for Congress campaign website 
Florida House of Representatives - Jared Moskowitz

|-

|-

1980 births
2008 United States presidential electors
21st-century American Jews
21st-century American politicians
American Jews from Florida
Democratic Party members of the Florida House of Representatives
Democratic Party members of the United States House of Representatives from Florida
Florida city council members
George Washington University alumni
Jewish members of the United States House of Representatives
Jewish American state legislators in Florida
Living people
Nova Southeastern University alumni
People from Coral Springs, Florida